Dziyana Ilyina (born 4 January 1996) is a Belarusian handballer for RK Podravka Koprivnica and the Belarus national team.

Achievements
Russian Super League:
Winner: 2016
Bronze Medalist: 2015 
Belarusian Championship:
Silver Medalist: 2015
Winner: 2016
Macedonian First League:
Winner: 2017
Macedonian Cup
Winner: 2017
EHF Champions League: 
Silver Medalist: 2017
Croatian League
Silver Medalist: 2022
Croatian Cup
Winner:'2022

References
  

1996 births
Living people
Sportspeople from Gomel
Belarusian female handball players
Expatriate handball players 
Belarusian expatriates in North Macedonia
Belarusian expatriate sportspeople in Russia
Belarusian expatriate sportspeople in Romania
RK Podravka Koprivnica players